Allan Bernard Bosworth (July 6, 1925 – May 3, 1990), using the pen-name J. Allan Bosworth, was an American author of children's adventure books. His father, Allan Rucker Bosworth, was also a writer.

Bosworth was born in San Diego, California in July 1925. He began writing while still a radioman aboard USS Missouri. World War II had just ended, and the ship was on her long voyage home.  A native Californian, he returned to San Francisco and took a job at the Chronicle. Ten years later, having published two novels and a few dozen short stories, he left the newspaper to begin writing on a full-time basis.  He lived in Salem, Virginia, the setting for All the Dark Places.

His best-known books are White Water, Still Water, about a boy stranded downriver by his raft, and All the Dark Places, about a boy lost in an Appalachian cave. White Water, Still Water was included by School Library Journal as one of the 26 best books of spring in 1966. Before developing the wilderness adventure theme, Bosworth wrote Voices in the Meadow, a fable of meadowland creatures facing dangerous predators. He died in Boston, Massachusetts in May 1990 at the age of 64.

Bibliography
A Bird for Peter, 1963,  Doubleday,  Criterion Books 
Voices in the Meadow, 1964, Doubleday 
White Water, Still Water, 1966, N.Y., Doubleday OCLC 519386  
All the Dark Places, 1968,  N.Y., Doubleday 
A Wind Named Anne, 1970, Doubleday 
A Darkness of Giants, 1972, Doubleday 
Among Lions,  1973,  Doubleday

References

External links

 

1925 births
1990 deaths
Writers from San Diego
Military personnel from California
20th-century American male writers
20th-century American novelists
American adventure novelists
American children's writers
20th-century pseudonymous writers